Robert Anderson Cooke (1880–1960) was an American immunologist and allergist.

In 1916 Cooke and Albert Vandeveer demonstrated the role of heredity in the origins of allergy. According to Cooke, 48% of his allergic patients had allergies in their family history. While the trait of allergy is transmitted through heredity, parents and children may be allergic to different substances.

In 1918, Dr. Cooke suggested a mechanism of action for allergen injections as a "desensitization or hyposensitization," analogous to tolerance achieved in experimental anaphylaxis induced in animals. This concept suggested that the injections of an increasing amount of allergen or antigen slowly neutralized those antibodies responsible for the allergic reaction.

References

1880 births
1960 deaths
American immunologists
Rutgers University alumni